UIT University (formerly Usman Institute of Technology (UIT)) is a not-for profit institute. UIT university's campus is located at the intersection of University Road and Abul Hasan Isphahani Road, Gulshan-e-Iqbal, Karachi, Pakistan.

On 18 December 2021, the inauguration ceremony was taken place by Governor of Sindh Imran Ismail in which the institute has now become a fully fledge university from a well renowned institute.

The university offers undergraduate studies in engineering, business management and computer science programmes.

Usman Memorial Foundation 
Usman Memorial Foundation was formed in 1973 in the memory of Late Mohammad Usman, by his family members, friends and well-wishers. Mr. A.K. Brohi was the first President, while Dr. Manzoor Ahmad was the Secretary General of the Foundation.

There were two Usman Memorial Scholarship awarded to research scholars namely Dr. Syeda Khatoon for research entitled "An Analysis of Religion Philosophy of Sir Syed Ahmed" and Dr. Rasheed Ahmed Jalandri for research entitled "Deoband Movement and Religious reforms". Both the research papers were published in the shape of a book.

In 1994, the Foundation established Usman Institute of Technology (UIT) on the plot of land allotted to the Foundation located at Abul Hasan Isphahani Road, with total contribution from the Hasham family.

History
UIT had its genesis due to an endowment from the Hasham family of the Memon community in remembrance of Mohammad Usman Hasham, son of Haji Hasham, a tycoon and a philanthropist.

Haji Hasham started his business career at the age of 11 in India early in the 20th century. After moving to Karachi in 1936, he started to expand his business. Industrial concerns like Mehran Sugar Mills, Mogul Tobacco, Pakistan Molasses Company, Usman Textile were part of his business. His sons had a desire to do something for the welfare of the community. Among his sons was a student of Dr. Manzoor Ahmad, a scholar and Dean of the Department of Philosophy at Karachi University. Usman was influenced by Dr. Manzoor's philosophy and shared his humanist values.

Usman died in 1973 at the age of 38 due to brain haemorrhage. However, his father and brothers, wanting to keep his memory alive, decided to make Usman's dreams a reality. Following the advice of Usman's mentor, Dr. Manzoor Ahmad and with the patronage of lawyer and writer, late Mr. A.K. Brohi, the ‘Usman Memorial Foundation’ was founded in 1973. Mr. Brohi agreed to be the President and Dr. Manzoor Ahmad was requested to be General Secretary of the Foundation.

The Foundation organized lectures by scholars, established a library and offered research scholarships. The Foundation acquired a piece of land in 1976 on the University Road to establish  an educational institution.

Eventually at the suggestion of Mr. Ebrahim Hasham and with the financial assistance of the Hasham Family, the Usman Institute of Technology was established in 1995 in affiliation with Technical University of Nova Scotia, Canada. In 1997, Usman Memorial Foundation signed an Agreement with Hamdard University for awarding their degrees to UIT students. Dr. Manzoor Ahmad, was made the Life Chairman of the executive board of UIT.

Programs offered

Accreditation
UIT's undergraduate programs are recognized by Higher Education Commission (HEC).

UIT's engineering programs are accredited by Pakistan Engineering Council (PEC).

UIT's computer science and software engineering program is accredited by National Computing Education Accreditation Council (NCEAC).

Undergraduate 
 B.E. Electrical (Electronics)
 B.E. Electrical (Telecommunication)
 B.E. Electrical (Power)
B.E Electrical (Computer System)
 B.S. Computer Science
 B.S. Software Engineering
 BBA

Student organizations

UITCS ACM Student Chapter
The UIT Computer Society (UITCS) is a group of undergraduate students dedicated to develop the interest of people in computing and information technologies. UITCS activities include poster sessions, seminars, workshops and competitions.

The society has established an R&D department to discover the problems facing local IT industries and find possible solutions.

In March 2006, the Association for Computing Machinery (ACM) officially chartered UITCS as a Student Chapter, so UITCS was renamed UITCS ACM Student Chapter. ACM, the Association for Computing Machinery, is an educational and scientific society uniting the world's computing educators, researchers and professionals.

UTECH
UTECH is a software competition in Pakistan. UTECH 2009 was organized at UIT campus at Abul-Hasan Isphani Road, Karachi. It was one of the largest information technology event of Pakistan with contests and exhibitions of software from all over the country and the neighboring countries of South Asia. It includes a Software Competition, Dynamic Programming Contest with the collaboration of ACM's NUCES Chapter, Kids Corner (where students from Grade School display their ideas), G3n. X (Generation Xtreme) Gaming Competition and book festival.

UIT Literary Society
For polishing literary skills, UIT has a literary society organized by students under the supervision of faculty from humanities department. UIT Literary society has yet to arrange any competitions/event.

UIT Reader's Club
Reader's Club was formed by Mufti Emad-ul-Haq and student Wajid Hassan to develop the understanding of the sociopolitical condition of the Pakistan and the importance of Islam to the country and its impact on the society and individuals. Readers club intends produce well behaved personalities with capabilities of tolerance. The discussions in this club are very analytical in nature and have developed strong communication skills among the students. Sessions of Reader's Club are arranged and organized by students on topics set or voted by students on their Facebook page. Topics regarding current events, no matter how controversial, have been discussed in previous sessions. All sessions are chaired by Mufti Emad-ul-Haq. Faculty members from various departments also join the sessions along with students. 
Another aim of this club is to develop interpersonal and communication skills among engineering students who are otherwise perceived to be shy.

International Partnership
Due to UIT's linkage with Dalhousie University of Canada, not less than 40 UIT students are continuing their education at Dalhousie University. A number of them after graduating from there have joined UIT faculty. Professors from Dalhousie University visit UIT to conduct guest lectures.

References 

Engineering universities and colleges in Pakistan
Universities and colleges in Karachi
Private universities and colleges in Sindh
Educational institutions established in 1995
1995 establishments in Pakistan